Christmas vs. the Walters is a 2021 American indie Christmas comedy film directed by Peter D'Amato and starring Shawnee Smith and Bruce Dern.

Cast

Release
In July 2021, Safier Entertainment acquired worldwide distribution rights to the film, which was released theatrically on November 5, 2021.  It was also released on VOD and Digital Platforms on November 26, 2021.

See also
 List of Christmas films

References

External links
 

2021 films
2021 comedy films
2021 independent films
2020s Christmas comedy films
American Christmas comedy films
2020s English-language films
American independent films
2020s American films